Deja Blue is an American brand of bottled water distributed by Keurig Dr Pepper in clear blue bottles. It was first available in Oklahoma, starting in 1996. By 2002, its distribution area encompassed ten states and it was sold in ten others.

References

Bottled water brands
Keurig Dr Pepper brands